The Rural Municipality of Moose Range No. 486 is a rural municipality (RM) in the Canadian province of Saskatchewan within Census Division No. 14 and  Division No. 4.

History 
The RM of Moose Range No. 486 incorporated as a rural municipality on December 11, 1916.

Geography

Communities and localities 
The following urban municipalities are surrounded by the RM.

Towns
 Carrot River

Resort villages
 Tobin Lake

The following unincorporated communities are within the RM.

Localities
 Battle Heights
 Blue Jay
 Moose Range
 Pas Trail
 Petaigan
 Pruden's Point
 Ravendale
 Smoky Burn

Demographics 

Attractions 
 Cumberland Delta
Pasquia Provincial Forest
D. Gerbrandt Recreation Site
 Pasquia Palaeontological Site
 Pasquia River Recreation Site
 Thunder Rapids Lodge

Government 
The RM of Moose Range No. 486 is governed by an elected municipal council and an appointed administrator that meets on the second Wednesday of every month. The reeve of the RM is Bud Charko while its administrator is Beverly Doerksen. The RM's office is located in Carrot River.

Transportation 
 Saskatchewan Highway 23
 Saskatchewan Highway 55
 Saskatchewan Highway 123
 Saskatchewan Highway 255
 Saskatchewan Highway 690
 Saskatchewan Highway 789
 Canadian National Railway

See also 
List of rural municipalities in Saskatchewan

References 

M